The striated yuhina (Staphida castaniceps) is a bird species in the white-eye family Zosteropidae.

It is found from the Himalayas to north-western Thailand. Its natural habitats are subtropical or tropical moist lowland forests and subtropical or tropical moist montane forests.

Gallery

References

Collar, N. J. & Robson, C. 2007. Family Timaliidae (Babblers)  pp. 70 – 291 in; del Hoyo, J., Elliott, A. & Christie, D.A. eds. Handbook of the Birds of the World, Vol. 12. Picathartes to Tits and Chickadees. Lynx Edicions, Barcelona.

striated yuhina
Birds of Bhutan
Birds of Northeast India
Birds of Myanmar
Birds of Thailand
striated yuhina
Taxonomy articles created by Polbot
Taxobox binomials not recognized by IUCN